Green imperialism or eco-imperialism or eco-colonialism or environmental imperialism is a derogatory epithet alluding to what is perceived as a Western strategy to influence the internal affairs of mostly developing nations in the name of environmentalism.

Etymology

The sceptical perception of the Brundtland report by the Third World elites was summarized as green imperialism by Helge Ole Bergesen in 1988. In 1999, the same meaning was used by Deepak Lal in his book "Green Imperialism: A Prescription for Misery and War in the World's Poorest Countries". Nonetheless, the same term is used differently in Richard Grove's book "Green Imperialism: Colonial Expansion, Tropical Island Edens and the Origins of Environmentalism 1600–1860" in 1995. In Grove's book, it means the impact of utopian tropical islands on European data-driven scientists resulting in early environmentalism.

The first mentions of the terms environmental colonialism or eco-colonialism appeared in connection with debt-for-nature swaps since 1989. It was feared that the however well-intentioned environmental protection programs could be perceived as middlesome and imperialistic. The establishment of national parks in Africa has in some cases led to the impoverishment and displacement of local populations.

Eco-imperialism also known as ecoimperialism was originally an abbreviation for ecological imperialism as in the book by Alfred Cosby, but changed its meaning after the publication of Paul Driessen's book "Eco-Imperialism: Green Power Black Death" in 2003. Cosby's eco-imperialism is interference with a degrading effect on the environment of targeted countries, while Driessen's eco-imperialism is interference with a degrading effect on the economy in the name of environmental improvement.

Potential examples

Several European governments announced boycotts of Malaysian timber due to unsustainable deforestation in Malaysia. Malaysia's Prime Minister, Mahathir Mohamed, opposed the boycotts, arguing that "we are not exploiting the forests for no good reason. We need money. We have to export wood because we need the foreign exchange without which we cannot buy what we want"

During "Battle in Seattle" in 1999, media presented environmentalism as a new form of imperialism. The rich, developed countries impose their environmental preferences and priorities on the developing countries.

In 2009, Germany called French proposal of carbon tariffs as eco-imperialism. Back then, greenhouse tariffs met strong opposition from developing countries such as India and China, since these tariffs would impact their exports.

The biofuel transnational meta-standard regulation of the European Union promotes certain sustainable fuels. However, this regulation extends beyond EU's jurisdistion and raises the issue of eco-imperialism.

In 2014, Joji Morishita, a Japanese commissioner, expressed his concerns about calls of sustainable whaling from the International Whaling Commission by the words "The whaling issue is seen as a symbol of a larger issue sometimes in Japan... You might have heard the word 'eco-imperialism'".

The approval of the World Bank loan of $3.05bn (£2.4bn loan) for 4,764 MW Medupi Power Station drew criticism for supporting increased global emissions of greenhouse gases. If the coal plant was not built, there would have been significant limitations placed on industrial development in the country.

Relation to neoliberalism
It is sometimes described as a combination of global environmental and broad neoliberal agendas. Eco-imperialism is perceived to result in a policy of commodification of all resources of earth. This tendency of commodification of nature for environmental goals is also known as "selling nature to save it".

Political debates

Critical voices depreciate environmentalism as an excuse for hindering economic development of developing countries. Critics see alternative energy sources as far from realistic, and fossil fuels as the key to lifting entire populations out of poverty. Developing nations, led by Brazil, India and Singapore, opposed entangling global trade with pollution controls in 1994, calling them hidden protectionism, which will keep jobs in the developed countries and deprive poor nations of their competitive advantages. The agenda of environmentalist NGOs is called neo-colonialism and eco-imperialism in 2022 by Japan, Peru, South Africa, Kenya and Bolivia. Eco-imperialism functions as a derogatory epiphet.

According to Anil Agarwal, a 1990 study by the World Resources Institute allocated responsibility for global warming to developing countries. Agarwal considered this study to be flawed, politically motivated, and unjust, and saw it more as exacerbating the North-South divide. In his 1991 paper, he called this an example of environmental colonialism and blamed U.S. overconsumption for global warming.

Environmental colonialism became a subject in the book "Apocalypse Never: Why Environmental Alarmism Hurts Us All" by Michael Shellenberger. In The Wall Street Journal, John Tierney, a long-standing critic of environmentalism, wrote that "Shellenberger makes a persuasive case, lucidly blending research data and policy analysis with a history of the green movement and vignettes of people in poor countries suffering the consequences of “environmental colonialism.”"

See also

 Cultural imperialism
 Ecoauthoritarianism
 Ecological debt
 Ecofascism
 Environmental justice
 Environmental racism
 Greenpeace Arctic Sunrise ship case
 White savior

References

External links

The West's Eco-Imperialism Against the Third World by Paul Driessen

Imperialism
Environmentalism
Green politics
International sustainable development
Political slurs